The Men's Slalom competition of the Vancouver 2010 Winter Paralympics was held at Whistler Blackcomb in Whistler, British Columbia. The competition was rescheduled to Sunday March 14 and Monday March 15 due to recent weather conditions.

Visually Impaired
In the slalom visually impaired, the athlete with a visual impairment has a sighted guide. The two skiers are considered a team, and dual medals are awarded.

Sitting

Standing

See also
Alpine skiing at the 2010 Winter Olympics – Men's slalom

References

External links
2010 Winter Plympics schedule and results, at the official website of the 2010 Winter Paralympics in Vancouver

Men's slalom
Winter Paralympics